An Extended Project Qualification (EPQ) is a qualification taken by some students in England and Wales, which is equivalent to 50% of an A level. They are part of level three of the National Qualifications Framework. It is currently graded A*-E.

The extended project was devised by Sir Mike Tomlinson in 2006, during his review of 16- to 19-year-olds' education. It was a compulsory part of the 14–19 Diploma taken by students in England and Wales between 2008 and 2013.

An EPQ is worth up to 28 UCAS tariff points.

Description
All students may take an extended project as a free-standing qualification, following a recommendation by the examination boards of England and Wales (Edexcel, OCR, AQA, WJEC, Eduqas and CIE) and England's former qualifications authority, the QCA.

There is no restriction on the topic a student chooses, but they must demonstrate that it is academically useful, either as an extension to their current course of study or syllabus or as relevant to their future career path. It takes the form of either a dissertation (5,000 words being a common guideline)  or a number of other forms: a musical or dramatical composition, report or artefact, backed up with paperwork. David MacKay, head of the 14–19 curriculum at the QCA, was in favour of EPQs, saying in 2009: "Extended projects can help students to develop and demonstrate a range of valuable skills through pursuing their interests and investigating topics in more depth." It has also been praised by universities for guiding students into higher education (typically universities). According to the QCA, an extended project is "a single piece of work requiring a high degree of planning, preparation, research, and autonomous working."

Approximately 30,000 students took the EPQ recently and this is growing by the year. Universities look positively at an EPQ and value its rigorous academic content and the vast amount of time taken to complete this. An EPQ contains 100% coursework, there is no exam and students tend to take this up in their second year in the sixth form. This is because the project helps students to gain a lot of new information and explore their interests in-depth after the transition to A-levels. It also indicates a keen interest in a particular subject, which is useful for those applying to university.

Effect of the 2020 pandemic
In response to the COVID-19 pandemic, in the summer of 2020 EPQ grades were awarded according to assessments made by teachers.

References

2006 establishments in England
2006 establishments in Wales
Educational qualifications in England
Educational qualifications in Wales